Centipede were an English jazz/progressive rock/big band with more than 50 members, organized and led by the British free jazz pianist Keith Tippett. Formed in 1970, it brought together much of a generation of young British jazz and rock musicians from a number of bands, including Soft Machine, King Crimson, Nucleus and Blossom Toes.

Centipede performed several concerts in England, toured France, and recorded a double album, Septober Energy (produced by Robert Fripp), before disbanding at the end of 1971. They reformed briefly in 1975 to play at a few French jazz festivals.

History
Centipede was formed by Keith Tippett in 1970 to perform an extended composition, Septober Energy, that he had been working on. The members were drawn from his own band at the time, The Keith Tippett Group; several British progressive rock, jazz-rock and avant-garde jazz groups, including Soft Machine (Robert Wyatt, Elton Dean, Nick Evans, Mark Charig), Nucleus (Karl Jenkins, Ian Carr, Brian Smith, Jeff Clyne, Roy Babbington, Bryan Spring, John Stanley Marshall) and King Crimson (Robert Fripp, Peter Sinfield, Ian McDonald, Boz Burrell); and students of the London School of Music. Septober Energy consisted of four movements, or "concepts", that the band improvised around. It was first performed by the band live at the Lyceum Theatre in London on 15 November 1970. 

Centipede toured France in November 1970, giving two "memorable performances" at the Alhambra Theatre in Bordeaux. They also played for the Rotterdam Arts Council in the Netherlands, at the Lanchester Arts Festival and the Bristol University Student Union. Centipede's concerts attracted "uneven reviews", with some critics calling Tippett's music "long and leaden", and others praising it as a "bold extension" of what Tippett and his band were already doing.

In April 1971, Neon Records, a British sub-label of RCA in the United States, signed up Tippett and Centipede, and Centipede recorded Tippett's composition on a double album, Septober Energy, in June that year. Robert Fripp produced the album and it was released in October 1971 in the United Kingdom only. Tippett had featured prominently on three of King Crimson's albums (In the Wake of Poseidon, Lizard and Islands) and Fripp had even invited Tippett to join the band (he declined). While some other Crimson members featured on Septober Energy, Fripp, who had performed live with Centipede, did not as he was too busy with his production duties. 

Centipede, now reduced in size for economic reasons, gave two performances in London to promote the album, one at the Royal Albert Hall in October 1971, and the other at the Rainbow Theatre in December 1971. But the album was not generally well received by critics and as no further engagements were forthcoming, Centipede disbanded at the end of 1971. 

In 1974 RCA issued Septober Energy in the United States, hoping to cash in on Fripp's name as the producer, but it failed, particularly because Centipede did not exist to promote the album with performances. The band did, however, reform briefly in October 1975, with David Cross from King Crimson, to perform at several French jazz festivals. 

Tippett said in a January 2003 interview that in 1970 the Centipede project was "quite innocent" and that "no-one was doing it for the money". Their debut performance at the Lyceum was a benefit concert for the Jazz Centre Society. Tippett said that at the time there was considerable interest in the project, and that while the initial performance consisted of 50 musicians, "there could have been 100".

Tippett later instigated The Ark, another large jazz ensemble that recorded the album Frames (Music For An Imaginary Film) for Ogun Records in 1978.

Recordings
Septober Energy (1971, 2 LPs, Neon Records)

Members
The members below are the personnel that appeared on Centipede's album, Septober Energy.

Violins
Wendy Treacher
Jihn Trussler
Roddy Skeping
Wilf Gibson (lead)
Carol Slater
Louise Jopling
Garth Morton
Channa Salononson
Steve Rowlandson
Mica Gomberti
Colin Kitching
Philip Saudek
Esther Burgi

Cellos
Michael Hurwitz
Timothy Kramer
Suki Towb
John Rees-Jones
Katherine Thulborn
Catherine Finnis

Trumpets
Peter Parkes
Mick Collins
Ian Carr (doubling flugelhorn)
Mongezi Feza (pocket cornet)
Mark Charig (cornet)

Alto saxophones
Elton Dean (doubling saxello)
Jan Steele (doubling flute)
Ian McDonald
Dudu Pukwana

Tenor saxophones
Larry Stabbins
Gary Windo
Brian Smith
Alan Skidmore

Baritone saxophones
Dave White (doubling clarinet)
Karl Jenkins (doubling oboe)
John Williams (bass saxophone, doubling soprano)

Trombones
Nick Evans
Dave Amis
Dave Perrottet
Paul Rutherford

Drums
John Marshall (and all percussion)
Tony Fennell
Robert Wyatt

Vocalists
Maggie Nichols
Julie Tippetts
Mike Patto
Zoot Money
Boz Burrell

Basses
Roy Babbington (doubling bass guitar)
Gill Lyons
Harry Miller
Jeff Clyne
Dave Markee
Brian Belshaw

Guitar
Brian Godding
Ollie Halsall

Piano
Keith Tippett (musical director)

References

External links

Collapso – Canterbury Music Family Tree

1970 establishments in England
1975 disestablishments in England
English progressive rock groups
British jazz ensembles
Jazz fusion ensembles
Canterbury scene
Musical groups established in 1970
Musical groups disestablished in 1975